Colin Murray Turbayne (7 February 1916 – 16 May 2006) was an Australian philosopher and an internationally recognized authority on the writings of George Berkeley. He spent most of his thirty five year academic career at the University of Rochester and was noted as the author of the book The Myth of Metaphor.

Biography

Early life
Turbayne was born on February 7, 1916, in the rural town of Tanny Morel in Queensland, Australia.  His father David Livingston Turbayne was a banker and his mother Alice Eva Rene Lahey was descended from an early pioneer family in Queensland.

Colin received his earliest education at the Church of England Grammar School in Brisbane, where he distinguished himself as both a cricketer and Head Prefect. He completed his Bachelor of Arts degree at the University of Queensland in Brisbane, Australia in 1940 as well as an MA degree in 1946. During World War II he worked for Australian Intelligence in the Pacific War theatre and served as Chief of Staff for Australian Intelligence to Douglas MacArthur in several pacific theatres.

in 1940 he married Ailsa Krimmer and subsequently raised a family of two boys: Ron and John. They remained happily married for fifty-one years until her death in 1992.

Academic studies
After emigrating to the United States following the conclusion of World War II in 1947, he undertook graduate studies at the University of Pennsylvania. In 1950 he earned both his MA and PhD degrees in Philosophy from the University of Pennsylvania.

 
His PhD. dissertation at the University of Pennsylvania Constructions Versus Inferences in the Philosophy of Bertrand Russell focused on the philosophical works of the British philosopher and logician Bertrand Russell (1950). His MA dissertation at the University of Queensland focused on Berkeley's philosophy as embodied in his Commonplace book(1947).

Following the completion of his advanced studies, Turbayne acquired his first academic post as an Assistant Professor of Philosophy at the University of Washington. He remained on the faculty from 1950 until 1955. Subsequently, he served as an Assistant Professor of Speech at the University of California at Berkley from 1955 until 1957. Soon thereafter, he was appointed as an Associate Professor of Philosophy at the University of Rochester in 1957. A short time later in 1962, he was promoted to Full Professor of Philosophy and continued to teach at the University of Rochester until his appointment to Professor Emeritus in 1981.

Academic works
In addition to serving as a lecturer, Turbayne was a noted authority and researcher on the philosophical insights of George Berkeley. Over the years, he edited several of Berkeley's works and essays, while helping to sustain interest in Berkeley's works during the mid twentieth century. In addition, he was the first commentator to recognize the central importance of metaphor in the philosophy of Berkeley. He is best known for his book The Myth of Metaphor which was published in 1962 by Yale University Press. A critical reviewer described the work as a "welcome addition to the analysis of metaphorical language".

In his book, Professor Turbayne argues that metaphor would necessarily occur in any language that could ever claim to embody richness and depth of understanding. In addition, he provides a critical analysis of the simplistic Cartesian and Newtonian depictions of the universe as little more than a "machine" - a concept which underlies much of the scientific materialism which prevails in the modern  Western world. He also provides evidence that the philosophical concept of "material substance"  or "substratum" has limited meaning at best and that modern man has unknowingly fallen victim to an unnecessary literal interpretation of one of many potentially beneficial metaphorical models of the universe.

Another central theme of The Myth of Metaphor is Turbayne's analysis of Berkelely's theory of vision and his theory of space as compared to Newtonian mechanics. Through careful analysis, Turbayne demonstrates that Berkeley's "language metaphor" provides a more convincing explanation of various natural phenomena including: the Barrovian case, the case of the horizontal moon and the case of the inverted retinal image.
Turbayne also provides a detailed review of Berkeley's effort to dispel the confusing use of metaphorical language in the description of the mind and in the description of ideas in general through the misuse of hypotheses which were initially developed to explain such occurrences in the physical world. As a result, Turbayne has been described as one of the leading interpreters of Berkeley's theories of vision and relative motion as well as Berkeley's relationship to both Kant and Hume. 

In his final book Metaphors for the Mind: The Creative Mind and Its Origins (1990), Turbayne illustrates the manner in which historical traditions in philosophical thought have contributed to accepted modern theories of human thought in general and theories of language in particular. Turbayne provides an in depth review of the early philosophical writings of both Plato and Aristotle, while illustrating the manner in which Platonic metaphors have influenced the works of both Berkeley and Emmanuel Kant. In addition, he demonstrates the manner in which Plato's procreation model as outlined within his Timeus has influenced modern theories of thought and language. He concludes by attempting to restore the original model which describes a mind in which both the female and male hemispheres function in concert to participate in the act of creation. A critical reviewer of the book noted that it contains interesting material which is likely to both provoke and surprise its readers. In addition, it has been described as presenting a contribution to the modern philosophical debate concerning relativism and philosophical realism.

Turbayne has been described as being convinced of Phenomenalism, as well as being skeptical of the validity of Materialism. In addition, he has been cited as supporting the view that metaphors are properly characterized as "categorical mistakes" which may lead an unsuspecting user to considerable obfuscation of thought.  

In the early 1990s Colin M. Turbayne and his wife established an International Berkeley Essay Prize competition in cooperation with the Philosophy Department at the University of Rochester in order to encourage continued research into Berkeley's works by aspiring young scholars.

Notable students of Colin Murray Turbayne include: Paul J. Olscamp - President Emeritus Bowling Green State University & Western Washington University.

Honors
During his long academic career Turbayne was a noted Fulbright Fellow as well as the recipient of a Guggenheim Fellowship in 1965 In 1959 and 1966 he was the recipient of grants from the American Council of Learned Societies for his contributions to their project on the linguistic structure of the mind. In 1979 he was honored as a Senior Fellow by the National Endowment for the Humanities (NEH). In addition, he was the recipient of an Honorary Doctorate in Humane Letters at Bowling Green State University. He was cited in Marquis' Who's Who in the World, 1982-1983. as well as Who was Who in America in 2010.

Turbayne's philosophical lectures at the University of Rochester were often punctuated with illustrative re-enactments of scenes from Shakespearian drama to illustrate his arguments. It was not at all unusual for him to appear before his students at lectures dressed in cloak and dagger quoting the moving scene from MacBeth: "Is this a dagger that I see before me..?" in order to illustrate the use of metaphor. He was considered a master Socratic interrogator who gently guided his students to the proper conclusion. He was also noted for his skillful use of the reductio ad absurdum in his lectures. Standing ovations from his grateful students were commonplace throughout his long tenure at the University.

Death
Colin Murray Turbayne died on May 16, 2006, in Queensland, Australia at the age of 90. He was survived by his two sons and two grandchilden.

Publications

Texts
Included among Colin Murray Turbayne's publications are the following texts:
 Three Dialogues between Hylas and Philonous by George Berkeley, Editor Colin Murray Turbayne (1954)
 A Treatise Concerning the Principles of Human Knowledge by George Berkeley, Editor Colin Murray Turbayne (1957) 
The Myth of Metaphor by Colin Murray Turbayne, with forewords by Morse Peckham and Foster Tait and appendix by Rolf Eberle. Columbia, S. C: University of South Carolina Press, 1970. Rev. of 1962 ed. Spanish ed., Fondo de Cultura Economica, Mexico, 1974. Reviewed by Paul J. Olscamp "The Philosophical Importance of С. M. Turbayne's The Myth of Metaphor." International Philosophical Quarterly 6 (1966): 110-31. 
 Works on Vision by George Berkeley, Ed. Colin Murray Turbayne (1963)
 Principles, Dialogues and Philosophical Correspondence by George Berkeley, Ed. Colin Murray Turbayne (1965)
 Berkeley: Principles of Human Knowledge, Text and Critical Essays Ed. Colin Murray Turbayne (1970).Reviewed by G. P. Conroy. Journal of the History of Philosophy 9 (1971): 510-12; J. M. Beyssade. Études philosophiques 4 (1970):523-26.
 Berkeley: Critical and Interpretive Essays, Ed. Colin Murray Turbayne (1982)

Journal articles
Selected peer-reviewed articles published by Colin Murray Turbayne include:
"Berkeley and Russell on Space". Dialectica (1954):210-227 
"Kant's Refutation of Dogmatic Idealism". The Philosophical Quarterly (1955):225-224
"The Influence of Berkeley's Science on his Metaphysics". Philosophy and Phenomenological Research (1956):476-87
"Grosseteste and an Ancient Optical Principle". Isis (1959):467-72.
"Berkeley's Two Concepts of Mind". Philosophy and Phenomenological Research(1959):85-92 In this collection of essays, Turbayne’s work comprised two papers that had been published in Philosophy and Phenomenological Research:
 "Berkeley’s Two Concepts of Mind"
 
"A Bibliography of George Berkeley, 1933-1962". The Journal of Philosophy (1963):93-112
"The Origin of Berkeley's Paradoxes". In Steinkraus, Warren E., ed. New Studies in Berkeley's Philosophy. New York: Holt, Rinehart and Winston, 1966. Foreword by Brand Blanshard. pp. 31–42.
"Visual Language From the Verbal Model". Journal of Typographical Research (1969):345-370
"Berkeley's Metaphysical Grammar". In Turbayne, Colin Murray. Berkeley, Principles … Text and Critical Essays(1970).pp. 3–36. 
"Visual Language". ECT (1971):51-58
"A Bibliography of George Berkeley, 1963-1974" Journal of the History of Philosophy (1977):83-95. 
"A Bibliography of George Berkeley 1963-1979". In Turbayne, Colin Murray, ed. Berkeley: Critical and Interpretive Essays. Manchester, 1982 pp. 313-329 
"Hume's influence on Berkeley". Revue Internationale de Philosophie (1985):259-269

Professional affiliations
Colin Murray Turbayne was an active member of both the American Philosophical Association as well as the American Association of University Professors.

See also 

George Berkely
Metaphysics
Epistemology
Philosophy of Language
Metaphor

References

External links
 Berkeley Prize Winners
 Colin Murray Turbayne's publications on JSTOR.org
 Colin Murray Turbayne's publications on Google Scholar

1916 births
2006 deaths
Australian emigrants to the United States
University of Pennsylvania alumni
University of Rochester faculty
George Berkeley scholars
20th-century Australian philosophers
American philosophy academics
Philosophy writers
Theorists on Western civilization
20th-century American philosophers
Philosophers of history
20th-century essayists
Philosophers from New York (state)
Fellows of the National Endowment for the Humanities